Roxy-James Rodriguez (born 25 November 1991) is a former professional Austrian darts player who has played in the Professional Darts Corporation events.

His brothers, Rowby-John and Rusty-Jake are also professional dart players.

References

External links
Profile and stats on Darts Database

1991 births
Living people
Austrian darts players
Game players from Vienna
Professional Darts Corporation associate players